Outcast is the seventh album by Hungarian heavy metal band Ektomorf, released in 2006 via Nuclear Blast.

Track listing

Personnel
 Zoltán Farkas — vocals/guitars/acoustic guitars
 Tamás Schrottner — guitars
 Csaba Farkas — bass
 József Szakács — drums

References

2006 albums
Ektomorf albums
Nuclear Blast albums
Albums produced by Tue Madsen